Kavat (also Romanized as Kavāt; also known as Kavārt) is a village in Poshtkuh Rural District, Chahardangeh District, Sari County, Mazandaran Province, Iran. At the 2006 census, its population was 361, in 74 families.

References 

Populated places in Sari County